The Red Wing Bridge was a cantilever bridge which carries U.S. Route 63 across the Mississippi River from Wisconsin to Red Wing, Minnesota. It is officially named the Eisenhower Bridge for Dwight D. Eisenhower, the 34th President of the United States, who opened the bridge in November 1960. After the collapse of the I-35W bridge in Minneapolis, the State of Minnesota conducted a thorough investigation of the state's road infrastructure, especially its bridges. The Red Wing Bridge was identified as in need of replacement; construction on the replacement span began in 2017 and the original bridge was demolished in February 2020

See also
List of crossings of the Upper Mississippi River

References

Further reading
 

Bridges completed in 1960
Bridges over the Mississippi River
Bridges of the United States Numbered Highway System
Buildings and structures in Goodhue County, Minnesota
Red Wing, Minnesota
Road bridges in Minnesota
Road bridges in Wisconsin
Transportation in Goodhue County, Minnesota
U.S. Route 63
Cantilever bridges in the United States
1960 establishments in Minnesota
1960 establishments in Wisconsin
Interstate vehicle bridges in the United States